Lautém (city) is a town in the suco of Pairara, Lautém administrative post, Lautém Municipality of East Timor.

When Timor was a Portuguese overseas province, Lautém was known as Vila Nova de Malaca.

Football

In football, the municipality of Lautém is represented by AS Lero, club affiliated to LFA, which disputes Liga Futebol Amadora Terceira Divisão.

Tourism

Tourists who visit the place usually register images of the Lautem Fort in photographs. However, the main tourist attractions in the village are the beautiful beaches.

References 

 Statoids.com

Lautém Municipality